Doong is a small inhabited island in the Don group, to the south west of Bantayan Island in the Philippines. It is part of the municipality of Bantayan, and holds two barangays – Doong and Luyongbaybay.

References

External links
Doong Island

Islands of the Don group (Bantayan)